The Boeing X-40 Space Maneuver Vehicle was a test platform for the X-37 Future-X Reusable Launch Vehicle.

History
The unpiloted X-40A was built to 85% scale to test aerodynamics and navigation of the X-37 Future-X Reusable Launch Vehicle project.

After the first drop test in August 1998 the vehicle was transferred to NASA, which modified it. Between April 4 and May 19, 2001, the vehicle successfully conducted seven free flights. In 2001 it successfully demonstrated the glide capabilities of the X-37's fat-bodied, short-winged design and validated the proposed guidance system.

Testing
The first X-40A drop test occurred at Holloman AFB, New Mexico on August 11, 1998 at 06:59. This was a joint Air Force/Boeing project known as Space Maneuver Vehicle. The vehicle dove to the runway in an approach similar to the Space Shuttle's, flared, and landed left of the runway centerline.

Specifications (X-40A)

See also

References

External links

 NASA Dryden X-40A Image Gallery
 X-40A Test Flight, Boeing press release
 X-40 Space Maneuver Vehicle Integrated Tech Testbed at FAS.org
 X-40 Space Maneuver Vehicle (SMV) at GlobalSecurity.org
 Boeing X-37 / X-40 page at Designation-Systems.Net

X-40
Spaceplanes
X-40, Boeing
1990s United States military gliders
V-tail aircraft
Military space program of the United States
Air Force Research Laboratory projects